Nergiz Altıntaş (born 16 August 1990) is a Turkish para table tennis player who competes at international table tennis competitions. She is a World silver medalist and a three-time European silver medalist. She has also competed at the 2012 and 2016 Summer Paralympics. In June 2021 she was in Lasko in Slovenia where she beat the Japanese player Yukimi Chada. She and her Turkish teammate, Merve Cansu Demir who also won her match, were awarded quota places for the postponed 2020 Summer Paralympics.

References

1990 births
Living people
People with paraplegia
Sportspeople from Nevşehir
Paralympic table tennis players of Turkey
Table tennis players at the 2012 Summer Paralympics
Table tennis players at the 2016 Summer Paralympics
Table tennis players at the 2020 Summer Paralympics
Turkish female table tennis players